Vanessa Anne Herrick (born 27 March 1958) is the Archdeacon of Harlow.

She was educated at the University of York; St John's College, Nottingham; Fitzwilliam College, Cambridge; and Ridley Hall, Cambridge. Herrick was ordained deacon in 1996, and priest in 1997. After a curacy in Bury St Edmunds she was a tutor at Ridley then Director of Mission and Vocation for the Diocese of Ely from 2003 until 2012. She was then Rector of Wimborne Minster from 2012 to 2015; and of the Northern Villages (Hinton Martell, Holt, Horton, Chalbury, Witchampton, Stanbridge, Long Crichel and More Crichel) until her appointment as Archdeacon of Harlow.

References

1958 births
Alumni of the University of York
Alumni of St John's College, Nottingham
Alumni of Fitzwilliam College, Cambridge
Alumni of Ridley Hall, Cambridge
Archdeacons of Harlow
Living people